Mariano Armellino (1657–1737) was a Benedictine historian, born in Rome (according to others, at Ancona).

At the age of twenty he entered the monastery of St. Paul in Rome, whence he was sent to Monte Cassino to complete his studies. From 1687 to 1695 he taught philosophy at various monasteries of the Cassinese Congregation. From 1697 to 1722 he devoted himself to preaching and became famous throughout Italy for his Lenten sermons. In 1722 Pope Innocent XIII appointed him abbot of the monastery at Siena; in 1729 he was transferred as abbot to the Monastery of St. Peter at Assisi, and in 1734, to the Monastery at St. Felician, near Foligno.

He wrote the Bibliotheca Benedictino-Casinensis, a list and sketch of the authors of the Cassinese Congregation, and a few other historical and hagiographical works concerning the Cassinese Congregation of Benedictines.

He died at Foligno.

References

Attribution

1657 births
1737 deaths
Italian Benedictines
18th-century Italian historians